Paul Sueo Hamaguchi (1 August 1948 – 28 December 2020) was a Japanese Roman Catholic bishop.

Hamaguchi was born in Japan and was ordained to the priesthood in 1975. He served as bishop of the Roman Catholic Diocese of Oita, Japan, from 2011 until his death in 2020.

Notes

1948 births
2020 deaths
21st-century Roman Catholic bishops in Japan
Japanese Roman Catholic bishops